The Fork River is a short river in the far south of the West Coast Region in New Zealand. As the name suggests, the river has two branches, with the longer South branch draining a plateau. The larger Spoon River lies a couple of kilometres to the north.

References

Rivers of the West Coast, New Zealand
Rivers of New Zealand